Phellinus igniarius (syn. Phellinus trivialis) is a fungus of the family Hymenochaetaceae. Like other members of the genus of Phellinus  it lives by saprotrophic nutrition, in which the lignin and cellulose of a host tree is degraded and is a cause of white rot. Common names are willow bracket and fire sponge

The fungus  forms perennial fruiting bodies   that rise as woody-hard, hoof or disc-shaped brackets from the bark of the infested living tree or dead log. The tree species is often willow but it may be commonly found on birch and alder and other broad leafed trees. The top is covered with a dark, often cracked crust, a stem is present only in its infancy. Unlike most fungi it has a hard woody consistency and may persist for many years, building a new surface layer each year. It was prized as kindling material. In Alaska, it is burnt by locals, and the ash (punk ash) is mixed with chewing tobacco to enhance the effect of the nicotine in the tobacco.

Description and ecology
The species is a polypore, with pores on the underside that bear basidiospores. The species causes a white rot that leads to the tree to decay. Woodpeckers are known to favour its site as a good place to excavate a nesting chamber since the wood will be soft and weaker around  its location.

The bracket measures,  5–20 cm in diameter, but in rare cases may be 40 cm wide. The thickness of the bracket varies from 2–12 cm,  to 20 cm in exceptional cases. These conks are among the longest persisting fungal fruit bodies, displaying up to eighty annual growth rings. The fungus  has small, grayish brown pores whose density is 4–6 per square mm. Its tubes have a length of about 2–7 mm. Each year, the fungus forms a new layer of  tubes superimposed on the old layers. Unreleased old spores often find themselves sealed in by later growth  that clog the tubes and they appear in cross section as brown spots. The flesh becomes harder with age and dryness, with humidity it softens. The smell of the fruit body has  a pronounced mushroom character, the flavor of the meat is bitter. Upon contact with potassium hydroxide, the flesh is dyed black. The spores of the P. igniarius form a whitish cast. It is considered to be inedible.

Gallery

References

Nut tree diseases
Stone fruit tree diseases
Fungal tree pathogens and diseases
Fungi of Europe
Fungi of North America
Fungi described in 1753
Inedible fungi
igniarius
Taxa named by Carl Linnaeus